Y Stiwdio Gefn (meaning The Back Studio) is a Welsh language music programme, broadcast regularly on S4C since January 2013. The programmes are presented by Lisa Gwilym. Y Stiwdio Gefn showcases Welsh language music, covering a variety of music genres, usually with a small number of bands or singers sharing the studio and taking turns to perform during a half hour broadcast.

New series have continued to be produced on a regular basis,  as well as the occasional special edition such as in August 2014 to celebrate the 40th anniversary of the first Welsh language rock opera, Nia Ben Aur, or a December 2015 broadcast performing music written by Alun 'Sbardun' Huws.

References

External links
 

2013 British television series debuts
S4C original programming
British music television shows